Trey Callaway is an American film and television writer and producer. In addition to working with Hollywood luminaries like Harrison Ford, Arnold Schwarzenegger, Ron Howard, and Tim Burton, Callaway has written and produced for shows like 9-1-1: Lone Star, CSI: NY, Rush Hour, Revolution, Station 19, and Supernatural (for which he created the popular recurring characters known as the Ghostfacers), and penned original pilots for multiple American entertainment companies including Amazon Studios, CBS, ABC, The CW, Turner Network Television, Showtime Network, Arts & Entertainment Network, and The Disney Channel.  

A graduate of Jenks High School in Jenks, Oklahoma, Callaway was once an on-air radio personality at KRMG (AM) in Tulsa, Oklahoma.

Career
Callaway was the executive producer and co-showrunner of the Fox Television crime procedural APB and was the showrunner of The CW drama The Messengers. He also wrote the screenplay for the movie I Still Know What You Did Last Summer. He co-created and executive produced the science fiction television series Mercy Point on the UPN network. Callaway performed as an actor in the series and among other roles, also had an uncredited speaking role in The Outsiders. 

Callaway is also a professor in the USC School of Cinematic Arts at the University of Southern California.

References

External links

Podcast Interview with Trey Callaway at Scripts & Scribes

USC School of Cinematic Arts alumni
American television writers
American male television writers
Living people
Year of birth missing (living people)
Place of birth missing (living people)
Radio personalities from Oklahoma
People from Jenks, Oklahoma
Screenwriters from Oklahoma